Vavpča Vas pri Dobrniču is a settlement in the Municipality of Trebnje in eastern Slovenia. It lies in a small valley north of Dobrnič. The area is part of the traditional region of Lower Carniola. The municipality is now included in the Southeast Slovenia Statistical Region.

Name
The name of the settlement was changed from Vavpča vas to Vavpča vas pri Dobrniču (literally, 'Vavpča Vas near Dobrnič') in 1955. The settlement was first mentioned in written sources in 1335 as Amanstorf (and as Amannstorf in 1383, and Ambtmansdorf in 1467). The Slovene name is derived from *Valp(o)ťa vas, literally 'reeve's village', from the Slovene common noun valpot 'chief steward at a manor' (borrowed from Old High German waltboto 'ruler's deputy'). The medieval German attestations of the name are based on the Middle High German word amman or ambetman 'steward'. Compare also Vavta vas.

References

External links
Vavpča Vas pri Dobrniču at Geopedia

Populated places in the Municipality of Trebnje